Mike Castle is an American actor and comedian from Chicago, Illinois.

Early life
He attended Brother Rice High School, graduating in 2007.

Career 
Castle began his career in 2011, playing Randy in the short called The Ghosts. The following year, Castle was in the 2012 television movie Family Trap. He also was in an episode of the television show Harder Than It Looks, playing the delivery guy.

In 2014, Castle was in an episode of the television series Sirens. Castle also appeared in the television mini-series Hope & Randy in 2014.

Castle starred as A.J. Salerno in the TBS television series Clipped, alongside Ashley Tisdale and George Wendt, in 2015.

Castle is known for playing Adam in Netflix's Brews Brothers. Castle played a videographer in season 11, episode 8 of Curb Your Enthusiasm.

Personal life 
He married actress Lauren Lapkus on October 5, 2018.

References

External links
 

Male actors from Chicago
21st-century American male actors
Living people
American male television actors
Year of birth missing (living people)